Avatha sumatrana  is a species of moth of the family Erebidae. It is found in Sumatra and Borneo.

References

External links

Moths described in 1985
Avatha
Moths of Borneo
Moths of Sumatra